The ocellated woodcreeper (Xiphorhynchus ocellatus) is a species of bird in the Dendrocolaptinae subfamily of the ovenbird family (Furnariidae). It sometimes includes the Tschudi's woodcreeper as a subspecies.

It is found in Bolivia, Brazil, Colombia, Ecuador, Peru, and Venezuela.
Its natural habitats are subtropical or tropical moist lowland forests and subtropical or tropical moist montane forests.

References

ocellated woodcreeper
Birds of the Amazon Basin
Birds of the Colombian Amazon
Birds of the Venezuelan Amazon
Birds of the Ecuadorian Amazon
Birds of the Peruvian Amazon
Birds of the Bolivian Amazon
ocellated woodcreeper
Taxonomy articles created by Polbot